Disynstemon paullinioides is a subspecies of legume, in the Fabaceae family. It belongs to the subfamily Faboideae. It is a liana that is native to Madagascar. It is the only member of the genus Disynstemon.

References

Millettieae
Fabaceae genera